Trapper Lake is located in North Cascades National Park, in the U. S. state of Washington. Trapper Lake is situated just northeast of Trapper Mountain and is not on a designated trail. The lake is accessible after a steep climb from the Upper Stehekin River Trail. The lake is fed by meltwater from the S Glacier on Hurry-up Peak, as well as runoff from Magic Mountain and Pelton Peak.

References

Lakes of Washington (state)
North Cascades National Park
Lakes of Chelan County, Washington